Tuomo Oskari Suomalainen (born 29 November 1931 in Gogland, Finland died 1 November 1988) was a Finnish architect. He worked very closely with his brother Timo Suomalainen who also was an architect. Most of the works they designed jointly.

Their most well known work is Temppeliaukio Church in Helsinki, which has become one of the most visited sites in Finland. Tuomo Suomalainen's last work was the chapel at Kellonummi cemetery in Espoo, this too, together with his brother. The chapel was inaugurated in 1993.

Some buildings (with Timo Suomalainen)
Temppeliaukio Church, Helsinki 1960–69
Haaga Vocational School, Helsinki 1962–67
Hotel Mesikämmen, Ähtäri 1973–76
Central Stores of the National Board of Antiquities, Orimattila 1975–79
Espoonlahti Church 1976–80 
Hamina police station and court house 1979–84

References

External links 
 

1931 births
1988 deaths
People from Kingiseppsky District
20th-century Finnish architects